Mount Bonney, is a  mountain summit located in Glacier National Park in the Selkirk Mountains of British Columbia, Canada. Mount Bonney is surrounded by ice including the Bonney Glacier, Clarke Glacier, Swanzy Glacier, and Bonney Névé. Its nearest higher peak is Mount Sir Donald,  to the northeast. Mount Bonney is visible from Highway 1, the Trans-Canada Highway at Rogers Pass.

History

The first ascent of the mountain was made in 1888 by Reverend William S. Green and Rev. Henry Swanzy. The first ascent by a lady was in 1904 by Henrietta L. Tuzo with guide Christian Bohren.

Mount Bonney, Bonney Glacier, and Bonney Névé were each named in 1888 by Reverend Green for Thomas George Bonney (1833–1923), president of the Geological Society of London and president of the Alpine Club of London.

The mountain's name was officially adopted in 1932 when approved by the Geographical Names Board of Canada.

Climate

Based on the Köppen climate classification, Mount Bonney has a subarctic climate with cold, snowy winters, and mild summers.

See also

Geography of British Columbia

References

External links
 Weather: Mount Bonney

Three-thousanders of British Columbia
Selkirk Mountains
Glacier National Park (Canada)
Columbia Country
Kootenay Land District